The BTV Cup or Bình Dương Television Cup is an international friendly cup held annually at Gò Đậu Stadium, home stadium of Vietnamese football club Becamex Bình Dương. Participating teams are mostly football clubs but there were some national youth sides in the past.

Champions

Participating teams

 Bình Dương (host)
 Đồng Tâm Long An 2000–2010, 2013, 2014, 2015
 Sông Lam Nghệ An 2003
 Ho Chi Minh City Police 2000, 2001
 Dong A Bank 2002, 2003
 Hai Quan F.C. 2001
 Hải Phòng F.C. 2003, 2008, 2011
 Da Nang F.C. 2005–2009, 2011, 2012, 2014
 Cang Sai Gon 2000–2002, 2005
 Đồng Tháp F.C. 2002, 2004
 Tiền Giang F.C. 2002
 Cần Thơ F.C. 2002
 Bình Định F.C. 2001, 2002, 2006
 Hoang Anh Gia Lai 2000, 2007
 Khatoco Khánh Hòa F.C. 2001, 2010
 Saigon Xuan Thanh F.C. 2011, 2012
 U22 Vietnam 2012, 2013
 Đồng Nai F.C. 2013
 Than Quảng Ninh F.C. 2014
 Matsubara 2004, 2006–2008, 2010, 2011
 Duque de Caxias 2009
 Grêmio Barueri 2012
 Bangu 2013, 2015, 2016
 Sport Clube Capixaba 2014
 Cambodia Olympic 2003
 Boeung Ket Angkor FC 2016
 Xiamen Lanshi 2005
 Wuhan 2006
 Dalian Shide 2007
 Chongqing Lifan 2009
 Etoile FC 2010
 REAC Sportiskola 2013
 East Bengal Club 2011
 Indonesia U20 2004
 Semen Padang F.C. 2013
 Avispa Fukuoka 2012
 Laos 2003
 MCTPC 2004
 Malaysia U21 2004
 New Radiant SC 2008
 Ayeyawady United F.C. 2014
 Tampines Rovers 2005
 Woodlands Wellington 2006
 Artmedia 2009
 MŠK Žilina 2011
 Suwon City FC 2004
 Ulsan Hyundai Mipo Dockyard 2005
 Busan Kyotong 2006
 Daejeon Citizen F.C. 2007
 Korea University Team 2008, 2013, 2014, 2015
 Krung Thai Bank F.C. 2003
 Osotsapa F.C. 2004
 PEA 2005
 Chonburi FC 2007, 2010, 2012
 BEC Tero Sasana F.C. 2014
 Kampala City 2009
 Express FC 2010
 SC Villa 2011

References

International association football competitions hosted by Vietnam
Recurring sporting events established in 2000
2000 establishments in Vietnam
Bình Dương province